Jamie Murray and Bruno Soares were the defending champions, but they chose not to participate together this year. Murray played alongside Neal Skupski, but lost in the semifinals to Ivan Dodig and Filip Polášek. Soares played alongside Mate Pavić, but lost in the semifinals to Juan Sebastián Cabal and Robert Farah.

Dodig and Polášek went on to win the title, defeating Cabal and Farah in the final, 4–6, 6–4, [10–6].

Seeds

Draw

Finals

Top half

Bottom half

References
Main draw

Western & Southern Open Doubles
Men's Doubles